Ali Azmat Butt (born 20 April 1970) is a Pakistani singer-songwriter, musician and actor. He is best known as the lead singer for the influential Sufi rock band Junoon and for his subsequent solo career later followed by a career as an actor as well. 

In 2001, with Junoon, he became part of the first Pakistani band ever to perform at the United Nations General Assembly.

Early life
Ali Azmat was born in Havelian, Khyber Pakhtunkhwa where his grandfather was posted as station master of Havelian railway station. He grew up in Garhi Shahu, Lahore, into a family of ethnic Kashmiri descent and speaks Punjabi as his native language. His father Nazir Ahmed Butt was a middle-class businessman who died in 2013. 

Azmat went to Sydney, Australia, for his higher studies but soon returned to Pakistan before completing university.

His first band Jupiters was known for performing covers at small gigs in Lahore.

Music career

Jupiters
Ali Azmat started out his career with Jupiters in 1986, based in his hometown of Lahore. Jupiters were known for doing covers of American pop and rock songs at small gigs. While with them, Azmat wrote his legendary hit song "Dosti". He later sang and recorded "Dosti" with Junoon, after which the song gained national fame.

Junoon
Azmat left Jupiters in 1990 to join Junoon. He released his first album Junoon with the band. The album was produced by band's founder and lead-guitarist Salman Ahmad. Azmat's vocals featured on all the songs except for "Khwaab", "Jiyain" and "Jogiya". After launch of the band's second album Talaash, both Ali Azmat and Junoon rose to fame.

In 1995, Azmat, alongside Junoon, launched Kashmakash, the first compilation album in Pakistan. One song from this compilation "Ehtesaab" caused a major controversy. 

The band's 1996 album, Inquilaab, was a major hit and its only single, "Jazba-e-Junoon", was a super hit and topped chart, it became the band's signature song and national song of 1996 Cricket World Cup and the Pakistan national cricket team. Azmat gained further success after release of the Sufi rock hit single "Sayonee" from their fourth album Azadi (1997). 

Azmat got international fame after release of Azadi in India. 

Azmat featured on four more albums Parvaaz (1999), Andaz (2001), Dewaar (2003), and Infiniti (2007) with the band. After release of Infiniti, the band broke-up, and Azmat continued his solo career.

On 25 December 2016, Junoon made a comeback after 13 years when they performed at a reunion concert in Karachi arranged by Sooper.

Solo career
After breaking up of Junoon, Azmat released his first solo album Social Circus (2005), whose single "Na Re Na" received positive reviews and became a major hit in country. Azmat released further four albums Klashinkfolk (the Urdu term for the AK-47; used to reference it's developer, Mikhail Kalashnikov) in 2008, Josh-e-Junoon (2010) whose title track "Josh-e-Junoon" became the anthem for the Pakistan cricket team during the 2011 Cricket World Cup, Bum Phatta (2011) and Chalta Main Jaun (2011).

Bollywood
Azmat stepped into Bollywood in 2003, when his single "Garaj Baras" from Junoon's album Azadi was used for the movie Paap. 

In 2012, Azmat recorded two songs "Yeh Jism Hai Toh Kya" and "Maula" for Bollywood erotic thriller Jism 2.

Acting career
He launched his acting career in the 1990s with Talaash, a TV miniseries featuring the group Junoon, and later in cinema with notable roles in box-office hits such as Waar (2013) and The Legend of Maula Jatt (2022).

Politics
Ali Azmat is close to Islamist defence analyst Zaid Hamid and hosted his TV show Iqbal Ka Pakistan in 2008–2009, where both discussed the philosophy of Allama Iqbal and a supposed Zionist conspiracy against the Islamic world.

Discography

Filmography
 Talaash (1993 PTV telefilm) 
 Waar (2013) as Ejaz Khan, politician
Junoon Reloaded (2020) 
 Jhol (unreleased)
 The Legend of Maula Jatt (2022) as Gogi

Awards and nominations
Junoon won the Best International Group award at the Channel V Awards in New Delhi in 1998, beating The Prodigy, Sting and Def Leppard. The band's first international release, Azadi, went triple platinum in India alone. "Sayonee" was at the top of the MTV India and Channel V charts for over two months. Junoon won the Award for Best Rock Band at the Indus Music Awards in 2004. Indus Music Awards and from ARY Asian/Bollywood Awards. Junoon has also been awarded several awards for their contribution towards peace and South East culture by BBC, UNESCO, and South Asian Journalists Association. Junoon was nominated for Best Musical Group at the Lux Style Awards several years in a row.
 First Indus Style Awards (2006)
 Won - Best Sound of Style Award. – 3rd Jazz IM Award (2006)
 Won - Best Pop Male Artist.
 The Nestle Fruita Vitals Pakistan Style Awards (2010)
 Won - Stylish Singer Male

References

External links
 
 
2007 Interview with Azmat on The Washington Post

Living people
Pakistani pop singers
Junoon (band) members
Singers from Lahore
Pakistani expatriates in Australia
Pakistani people of Kashmiri descent
1970 births
Pakistani rock guitarists
Pakistani heavy metal singers
Pakistani conspiracy theorists
Anti-Zionism